Harold Taylor may refer to:

Harold Taylor (Canadian politician), politician from Manitoba
Harold Taylor (Australian politician) (1892–1972), company executive and member of the Queensland Legislative Assembly
Harold Taylor (basketball coach), University of Minnesota head basketball coach in the 1920s
Harold Burfield Taylor (1890–1966), Australian Army officer in World Wars I and II
Harold Dennis Taylor (1862–1943), British optical designer
Harold E. Taylor (1939–2001), American physicist and academic
Harold Taylor (polymath) (1907–1995), New Zealand-born British art historian, mathematician, and physicist
Harold Taylor (footballer, born 1912) (1912–?), footballer for Liverpool and Stoke City
Harold Taylor (footballer, born 1902) (1902–1963), English footballer
Harold Taylor (cricketer) (1909–1990), English cricketer
Harold Taylor (educator) (1914–1993), president of Sarah Lawrence College

See also
Harry Taylor (disambiguation)
Lal Taylor (1910–1970), English footballer